"One, Two, Buckle My Shoe" is a popular English language nursery rhyme and counting-out rhyme. It has a Roud Folk Song Index number of 11284.

Lyrics
A common version is given in The Oxford Dictionary of Nursery Rhymes:

One, two, buckle my shoe;
Three, four, knock at the door;
Five, six, pick up sticks;
Seven, eight, lay them straight;
Nine, ten, a big fat hen;
Eleven, twelve, dig and delve;
Thirteen, fourteen, maids a-courting;
Fifteen, sixteen, maids in the kitchen;
Seventeen, eighteen, maids in waiting;
Nineteen, twenty, my plate's empty.

Other sources give differing lyrics.

Origins and meaning
The rhyme is one of many counting-out rhymes. It was first recorded in Songs for the Nursery, published in London in 1805. This version differed beyond the number twelve, with the lyrics:

Thirteen, fourteen, draw the curtain,
Fifteen sixteen, the maid's in the kitchen,
Seventeen, eighteen, she's in waiting,
Nineteen, twenty, my stomach's empty.

A version published five years later in Gammer Gurton's Garland (1810) was titled "Arithmetick" and had the following different lines:

Three, four, Lay down lower ...
Eleven twelve, Who will delve...
Fifteen, sixteen, Maids a-kissing...
Nineteen, twenty, My Belly's empty.

According to Henry Bolton, collector of counting rhymes in the 1880s, the rhyme was used in Wrentham, Massachusetts as early as 1780.

A different version was published in 1833 from "The Only True Mother Goose Melodies" which preserved some of the changes in previous versions and contained variations for the lyrics for "open the door" and "I hope you're well":

One, Two — buckle my shoe;
Three, Four — close the door;
Five, Six — pick up sticks;
Seven, Eight — lay them straight;
Nine, Ten — do it again;
Eleven, Twelve — I hope you’re well.
Thirteen, Fourteen — draw the curtain;
Fifteen, Sixteen — the maid’s in the kitchen;
Seventeen, Eighteen — she’s in waiting.
Nineteen, Twenty — my stomach’s empty.

A version titled "Numerical Nursery Rhyme" was published in 1899 from "A History of Nursery Rhymes" and introduces the unique lyrics "shut the door". This particular line appears to be regional, with "shut the door" being better known at present in the United States and Canada and "knock at the door" in the United Kingdom:

One, two, buckle my shoe;
Three, four, shut the door;
Five, six, pick up sticks;
Seven, eight, lay them straight;
Nine, ten, a good fat hen;
Eleven, twelve, who will delve?
Thirteen, Fourteen, maids a-courting;
Fifteen, sixteen, maids in the kitchen;
Seventeen, eighteen, maids a-waiting;
Nineteen, twenty, my stomach's empty."

Illustrated publications
The rhyme was sometimes published alone in illustrated editions. That with lithographs by Caroline R. Baillie (Edinburgh, 1857) had an oblong format showing domestic 18th-century interiors. There were also two editions of the rhyme published from London, both illustrated by Walter Crane. The first was a single volume picture-book (John Lane, 1869) with end-papers showing a composite of the 1 – 10 sequence and of the 11 – 20 sequence. It was followed in 1910 by The Buckle My Shoe Picture Book, containing other rhymes too. This had coloured full-page illustrations: composites for lines 1-2 and 3-4, and then one for each individual line.

In America the rhyme was used to help young people learn to count and was also individually published. Of the 21 pages in Hurd and Houghton’s edition, published in New York about 1870, there were ten taken up by Augustus Hoppin’s nonsense drawings. In Old Mother Goose’s Rhymes And Tales (London and New York, 1889) there was only a single page given to the rhyme, illustrated by Constance Haslewood in the style of Kate Greenaway.

Notes

Counting-out rhymes
English nursery rhymes
English folk songs
English children's songs
Traditional children's songs

da:Fine sko med spænder